Lists of Australian state governors cover the governors of the Australian states.  
The governors are the viceroys of the Australian monarch. They perform constitutional and ceremonial functions at the state level.

Lists by state

 List of Governors of New South Wales
 List of Governors of Queensland
 List of Governors of South Australia
 List of Governors of Tasmania
 List of Governors of Victoria
 List of Governors of Western Australia